The 1963–64 season was the Royals 16th season in the NBA and its seventh in Cincinnati. The Royals finished in 2nd place with a 55–25 record, the second best record in the NBA.
The team's outstanding roster included Oscar Robertson, Jerry Lucas, Team Captain Wayne Embry, Jack Twyman, Arlen Bockhorn, Bob Boozer,  Tom Hawkins, Adrian Smith, Bud Olsen, Larry Staverman and coach Jack McMahon .
The team is noteworthy for having both the NBA MVP in Robertson and the NBA Rookie of the Year in Lucas, a rare occurrence in NBA history.
The team played most of their home games at Cincinnati Gardens arena, but also hosted home games that season in  Dayton, Lima, Columbus at Saint John arena and Cleveland at Cleveland Arena.
In the playoffs the Royals defeated the Philadelphia 76ers in a 5-game series, but both Lucas and Olsen would be lost to injury. In the Eastern Conference Final, the Royals were eliminated by the Boston Celtics, who triumphed in 5 games.

Draft picks 
Tom Thacker from the outstanding University of Cincinnati program was another territorial draft pick, the team's first this year.
Shooter Jimmy Rayl was the team's second-round selection. He was cut, but later played in the ABA.

Regular season

Season standings

Record vs. opponents

Season Schedule 

The Royals consistently posted winning marks over the full season for each month of play.
Oct 5–3, Nov 10–6, Dec 9–4, Jan 11–6, Feb 14–3, March 6–3, plus a 4–6 record in the playoffs.
Four of the five Boston playoff games took place in April.

Playoffs 

|- align="center" bgcolor="#ccffcc"
| 1
| March 22
| Philadelphia
| W 127–102
| Oscar Robertson (31)
| Jerry Lucas (25)
| Oscar Robertson (16)
| Cincinnati Gardens6,238
| 1–0
|- align="center" bgcolor="#ffcccc"
| 2
| March 24
| @ Philadelphia
| L 114–122
| Oscar Robertson (30)
| Wayne Embry (11)
| three players tied (5)
| Municipal Auditorium4,510
| 1–1
|- align="center" bgcolor="#ccffcc"
| 3
| March 25
| Philadelphia
| W 101–89
| Oscar Robertson (28)
| Jack Twyman (21)
| —
| Cincinnati Gardens7,171
| 2–1
|- align="center" bgcolor="#ffcccc"
| 4
| March 28
| @ Philadelphia
| L 120–129
| Oscar Robertson (31)
| Oscar Robertson (14)
| Arlen Bockhorn (7)
| Municipal Auditorium4,255
| 2–2
|- align="center" bgcolor="#ccffcc"
| 5
| March 29
| Philadelphia
| W 130–124
| Oscar Robertson (32)
| Wayne Embry (17)
| —
| Cincinnati Gardens7,913
| 3–2
|-

|- align="center" bgcolor="#ffcccc"
| 1
| March 31
| @ Boston
| L 87–103
| Wayne Embry (21)
| Wayne Embry (16)
| Robertson, Arnette (3)
| Boston Garden13,909
| 0–1
|- align="center" bgcolor="#ffcccc"
| 2
| April 2
| @ Boston
| L 90–101
| Oscar Robertson (30)
| Oscar Robertson (12)
| Oscar Robertson (9)
| Boston Garden13,909
| 0–2
|- align="center" bgcolor="#ffcccc"
| 3
| April 5
| Boston
| L 92–102
| Oscar Robertson (34)
| Jerry Lucas (24)
| —
| Cincinnati Gardens11,850
| 0–3
|- align="center" bgcolor="#ccffcc"
| 4
| April 7
| Boston
| W 102–93
| Oscar Robertson (33)
| Jerry Lucas (25)
| Jerry Lucas (10)
| Cincinnati Gardens
| 1–3
|- align="center" bgcolor="#ffcccc"
| 5
| April 9
| @ Boston
| L 95–109
| Oscar Robertson (24)
| Wayne Embry (10)
| Oscar Robertson (6)
| Boston Garden13,909
| 1–4
|-

Player statistics

Regular season 
Robertson led the NBA in assists and was second in scoring. He also led the NBA in free throws made and free throw percentage.
Lucas led the NBA in field goal percentage, and was third in rebounding.

Playoffs

Awards and honors 
 Jerry Lucas: NBA Rookie of the Year, Second Team All-NBA, NBA All-Star
 Oscar Robertson: NBA Most Valuable Player, First Team All-NBA, MVP of the 1964 NBA All-Star Game.
 Wayne Embry: NBA All-Star

References

External links 
 Royals on Basketball Reference
 http://www.sportsecyclopedia.com/nba/cincy/cincyroyals.html
 http://www.ohiohistorycentral.org/w/Cincinnati_Royals
 https://web.archive.org/web/20150917052242/http://www.databasebasketball.com/teams/teampage.htm?tm=CIN&lg=n

Sacramento Kings seasons
Cincinnati
Cincinnati
Cincinnati